The International Journal of Clinical Pharmacy is a bimonthly peer-reviewed medical journal covering all aspects of clinical pharmacy and related practice-oriented subjects. It was established in 1965 and is published by Springer Science+Business Media.. The editor-in-chief is Professor Derek Stewart. The journal was called Pharmacy World & Science until 2010. According to the Journal Citation Reports, the journal has a 2021 impact factor of 2.305.

References

External links

English-language journals
Springer Science+Business Media academic journals
Bimonthly journals
Publications established in 1979